Lithocarpus kochummenii is a tree in the beech family Fagaceae. It is named for the botanist K. M. Kochummen.

Description
The reddish brown bark is fissured or lenticellate. The flowers are solitary along the rachis.

Distribution and habitat
Lithocarpus kochummenii is endemic to Borneo.

References

kochummenii
Endemic flora of Borneo
Plants described in 1998